Dragan Stanković (born 18 October 1985) is a Serbian volleyball player, a member of Serbian national team and Italian club Modena Volley, a participant of the Olympic Games London 2012, bronze medalist of the World Championship, European Champion 2011, medalist of World League.

In 2020 Stanković changed the Federation of origin, playing with the Italian sporting nationality from the 2020-2021 season.

Career

National team
His been a long time member of Serbian national team, where he became squad captain after Bojan Janić decided to retire from national team. With national team he won a gold medal at the European Championships in 2011 which was held in Austria and Czech Republic. In his collection he also have a four silver medals and one bronze from the World Leagues. In 2010 he won a bronze medal in the World Championship in Italy, so as on three European Championships before. He was also a participant of Olympic Games in London in 2012. On 19 July 2015 Serbian national team with him in squad went to the final of World League, but they lost with United States 0–3 and achieved silver medal.

Sporting achievements

Clubs

FIVB Club World Championship
  2017 – with Cucine Lube Civitanova
  2018 – with Cucine Lube Civitanova

CEV Champions League
  2015/2016 - with Cucine Lube Civitanova
  2016/2017 - with Cucine Lube Civitanova
  2017/2018 - with Cucine Lube Civitanova
  2018/2019 - with Cucine Lube Civitanova

CEV Challenge Cup
  2010/2011 - with Lube Banca Macerata

National championships
 2007/2008  Serbian Championship, with OK Crvena Zvezda
 2008/2009  Montenegrin Championship, with Budvanska Rivijera Budva
 2011/2012  Italian Championship, with Lube Banca Macerata
 2012/2013  Italian SuperCup 2012, with Lube Banca Macerata
 2013/2014  Italian Championship, with Lube Banca Macerata
 2014/2015  Italian SuperCup 2014, with Lube Banca Macerata
 2016/2017  Italian Cup, with Cucine Lube Civitanova
 2016/2017  Italian Championship, with Cucine Lube Civitanova
 2018/2019  Italian Championship, with Cucine Lube Civitanova

National team
 2005  FIVB World League
 2005  CEV European Championship
 2007  CEV European Championship
 2008  FIVB World League
 2009  FIVB World League
 2010  FIVB World League
 2010  FIVB World Championship
 2011  CEV European Championship
 2013  CEV European Championship
 2015  FIVB World League
 2016  FIVB World League
 2017  CEV European Championship

References

External links

 Dragan Stankovic at the International Volleyball Federation
 
 
 
 

Living people
1985 births
People from Zaječar
Serbian men's volleyball players
Olympic volleyball players of Serbia
Volleyball players at the 2012 Summer Olympics
Serbian expatriate sportspeople in Montenegro
Expatriate volleyball players in Montenegro
Serbian expatriate sportspeople in Italy
Expatriate volleyball players in Italy
European champions for Serbia
Volley Lube players
Modena Volley players